Pikeliai is a village in Kėdainiai district municipality, in Kaunas County, central Lithuania. It is located nearby the Jaugila river. According to the 2011 census, the village has a population of 21 people.

Demography

References

Villages in Kaunas County
Kėdainiai District Municipality